Melzer's reagent (also known as Melzer's iodine reagent, Melzer's solution or informally as Melzer's) is a chemical reagent used by mycologists to assist with the identification of fungi, and by phytopathologists for fungi that are plant pathogens.

Composition
Melzer's reagent is an aqueous solution of chloral hydrate, potassium iodide, and iodine. Depending on the formulation, it consists of approximately 2.50-3.75% potassium iodide and 0.75–1.25% iodine, with the remainder of the solution being 50% water and 50% chloral hydrate. Melzer's is toxic to humans if ingested due to the presence of iodine and chloral hydrate. Due to the legal status of chloral hydrate, Melzer's reagent is difficult to obtain in the United States.

In response to difficulties obtaining chloral hydrate, scientists at Rutgers formulated Visikol (compatible with Lugol's iodine) as a replacement. In 2019, research showed that Visikol behaves differently to Melzer’s reagent in several key situations, noting it should not be recommended as a viable substitute.

Melzer's reagent is part of a class of iodine/potassium iodide (IKI)-containing reagents used in biology; Lugol's iodine is another such formula.

Reactions
Melzer's is used by exposing fungal tissue or cells to the reagent, typically in a microscope slide preparation, and looking for any of three color reactions:
 Amyloid or Melzer's-positive reaction, in which the material reacts blue to black.
 Pseudoamyloid or dextrinoid reaction, in which the material reacts brown to reddish brown.
 Inamyloid or Melzer's-negative, in which the tissues do not change color, or react faintly yellow-brown.

Among the amyloid reaction, two types can be distinguished:
 Euamyloid reaction, in which the material turns blue without potassium hydroxide (KOH)-pretreatment.
 Hemiamyloid reaction, in which the material turns red in Lugol's solution, but shows no reaction in Melzer's reagent; when KOH-pretreated it turns blue in both reagents (hemiamyloidity).

Melzer's reactions are typically almost immediate, though in some cases the reaction may take up to 20 minutes to develop.

The function of the chemicals that make up Melzer's reagent are several. The chloral hydrate is a clearing agent, bleaching and improving the transparency of various dark-colored microscopic materials. The potassium iodide is used to improve the solubility of the iodine, which is otherwise only semi-soluble in water. Iodine is thought to be the main active staining agent in Melzer's; it is thought to react with starch-like polysaccharides in the cell walls of amyloid material, however, its mechanism of action is not entirely understood. It has been observed that hemiamyloid material reacts differently when exposed to Melzer's than it does when exposed to other IKI solutions such as Lugol's, and that in some cases an amyloid reaction is shown in material that had prior exposure to KOH, but an inamyloid reaction without such pretreatment.

An experiment in which spores from 35 species of basidiomycetes were tested for reactions to both Melzer's and Lugol's showed that spores in a large percentage of the species tested display very different reactions between the two reagents. These varied from being weakly or non-reactive in Lugols, to giving iodine-positive reactions in Lugol's but not in Melzer's, to even giving dextrinoid reactions in Lugol's while giving amyloid reactions in Melzer's.

Melzer's degrades into a cloudy precipitate when combined with alkaline solutions, hence it cannot be used in combination or in direct series with such common mycological reagents such as potassium hydroxide or ammonium hydroxide solutions. When potassium hydroxide is used as a pretreatment, the alkalinity must be first neutralized before adding Melzer's.

History
The use of iodine-containing solutions as an aid to describing and identifying fungi dates back to the mid-19th century.

Melzer's reagent was first described in 1924 and takes its name from its inventor, the mycologist Václav Melzer, who modified an older chloral hydrate-containing IKI solution developed by botanist Arthur Meyer. Melzer was a specialist in Russula, a genus in which the amyloidy on the spore ornamentation or entire spore is of great taxonomic significance.

References

Further reading
 Blackwell M, et al. 2001. The presence of glycine betaine and the dextinoid reaction in basidiomata. Harvard Papers in Botany 6:35–41.
 Rossman AY. 1980. The iodine reaction: Melzer's vs. IKI. MSA newsletter 31:22.

Mycology
Chemical tests
Analytical reagents